The 2022 South Dakota Senate elections were held on November 8, 2022, as part of the biennial 2022 United States elections. All 35 seats in the South Dakota Senate were up for election. Primary elections were held on June 7, 2022. The elections coincided with elections for other offices in South Dakota, including the US Senate, US House, South Dakota Governor, South Dakota Secretary of State, South Dakota Attorney General, and the South Dakota House.
 
Following the 2022 elections, Republicans maintained their supermajority by losing only one seat, giving them a 31-to-4 member advantage over Democrats.

Retirements

Democrats
District 26: Troy Heinert retired due to term limits.

Republicans
District 2: Brock Greenfield retired due to term limits.
District 7: V. J. Smith retired.
District 9: Wayne Steinhauer retired.
District 12: Blake Curd retired due to term limits.
District 17: Arthur Rusch retired due to term limits.
District 25: Marsha Symens retired.
District 29: Gary Cammack retired due to term limits.
District 31: Timothy Johns retired.

Predictions

Results

Overview

Defeated Incumbents

Primary Election
District 24: Republican Mary Duvall lost renomination to Jim Mehlhaff.

General Election
District 10: Republican Margaret Sutton was defeated in the general election by Democrat Liz Larson.

Summary of Results by State Senate District

Primary Election Results Source:

General Election Results Source:

Detailed Results

Primary Election Results Source:

General Election Results Source:
Note: If a primary election is not listed, then there was not a competitive primary in that district (i.e., every candidate who ran in the primary advanced to the general election).

District 1
Republican primary

General election

District 2
Republican primary

General election

District 3
Republican primary

General election

District 4
General election

District 5
Republican primary

General election

District 6
General election

District 7
Republican primary

General election

District 8
Republican primary

General election

District 9
Republican primary

General election

District 10
General election

District 11
General election

District 12
General election

District 13
General election

District 14
General election

District 15
General election

District 16
Republican primary

General election

District 17
General election

District 18
General election

District 19
General election

District 20
General election

District 21
General election

District 22
General election

District 23
Republican primary

General election

District 24
Republican primary

General election

District 25
Republican primary

General election

District 26
General election

District 27
General election

District 28
General election

District 29
Republican primary

General election

District 30
Republican primary

General election

District 31
Republican primary

General election

District 32
General election

District 33
Republican primary

General election

District 34
General election

District 35
General election

Results

Close races
Districts where the margin of victory was under 10%:
 District 27, 2.9%
 District 15, 5.52%
 District 26, 5.68%
 District 12, 7.76%
 District 14, 7.86%

Red denotes races won by Republicans. Blue denotes races won by Democrats.

References 

South Dakota Senate elections
South Dakota Senate
Senate